was a Japanese kirikane artist. She was a Living National Treasure of Japan and a member of the Japan Kōgei Association. Her husband is a Buddhist image sculptor Kokei Eri. Her daughter is a Kirikane artist Tomoko Eri. Her son is an artist Naoki Eri.

Biography

She was born into a family of Japanese embroiderers; she learned Japanese style of painting and dyeing. She started kirikane in 1974  after she married Kokei Eri, a sculptor of Buddhist images.  Since acquiring the skill, she has tried to expand her scope as an artist, actively using the kirikane technique not only for traditional Buddhist images but for modern handicrafts as well. Her work includes objects such as boxes, trays, incense containers, green tea powder containers, plaques, wall decorations, folding screens and room dividers. 

She had exhibited her works in private and public exhibitions. She won the President of Japan Art Crafts Association Prize, the grand prize of the exhibition, in 1991 and the Prince Takamatsu Memorial Prize in 2001. She had also won many prizes in the Kinki District exhibitions of Japanese Traditional Art Crafts Exhibitions and the Seventh Category exhibitions of Japanese Traditional Art Crafts Exhibitions. She participated in the decoration of the Kyoto State Guest House. 

She was honoured as an Important Intangible Cultural Property, also known as Living National Treasure (Japan), on July 8, 2002, for her expertise and contributions in kirikane.

Eri Sayoko died unexpectedly on October 3, 2007, at the age of 62, in Amiens, France.

Prizes
Prize of 14th Japan Art Crafts Association in the Exhibition of Kinki District Japanese Traditional Art Crafts for "Octagonal box, Butterfly Fantasy" in 1985
The Asahi Shimbun Prize in the 6th Exhibition of Nanabukai Japanese Traditional Art Crafts Association for "Ornamental small box, Blossoming" in 1990
President Prize of 38th Japan Art Crafts Association in the Exhibition of Japanese Traditional Art Crafts for "Ornamental box, Flowering Art  and Elegance" in 1991
Prize of Japan Art Crafts Association in the 8th Exhibition of Nanabukai Japanese Traditional Art Crafts Association for "Ornamental small box, Fine Moment" in 1992
Nihon Keizai Shimbun Prize in the 22nd Exhibitions of Kinki District Japanese Traditional Art Crafts for "Ornamental box, Blossoming Flower" in 1993
Takamatsunomiya Commemorative Prize in the 48th Exhibition of Japanese Traditional Art Crafts for "Ornamental box, Silk Road Fantasy" in 2001

References

Sayoko Eri Kirikane World -Brilliance and Romance of Gold Leaf-  
Kirikane of Sayoko Eri, Tsukuru(Creation) 1 - Encounters with 13 Crafts Artists, organized by NHK(Nihon Broadcast Association9, 1990, by Japan Broadcast Publishing Co.

External links

Heian Bussho (平安佛所)

1945 births
2007 deaths
Living National Treasures of Japan
20th-century Japanese women
Artists from Kyoto Prefecture
Japanese women artists
20th-century Japanese artists
21st-century Japanese women